Karere Railway Station was a passenger and freight station, located south of Palmerston North, which served the Foxton Branch Line in New Zealand. It served the branch line from 1873 until the line's closure in 1959.

The station was important for the district's growing industries, especially those of forestry and flax. Local goods were transported from the station to Foxton's port where they were shipped to a larger centre. The station's freight facilities were expanded in 1930 to meet the area's growing demand for transport. These improvements included accommodations for livestock transportation.

In 1936 the station's passenger shelter was destroyed by a cyclone and not rebuilt. The cyclone also damaged the Terrace End Railway Station in Palmerston North.

The Foxton branchline was closed and ripped up in 1959. The concrete station platform is one of the few remains of the line, and can be found along State Highway 58. The station's original sign is mounted to the station facing the road.

References

Defunct railway stations in New Zealand
Rail transport in Manawatū-Whanganui
Buildings and structures in Manawatū-Whanganui
Railway stations opened in 1873
Railway stations closed in 1959